102nd Logistic Brigade (102 Log Bde) is a logistic brigade of the British Army. Its role is to force generate and force prepare fighting elements, including the Headquarters, globally, for current operations and deliver capability to contingent forces as directed by 1st UK Division in order to support the delivery of operational success.

History 

102nd Logistic Brigade traces its origin to 102 Beach Sub-Area, Normandy, France. It was one of 3 such formations raised late in 1943 to run logistic support operations across Juno Beach, from D-day until the Mulberry artificial harbours were operational. Once the Mulberry harbours were in use, there was no further requirement for the Beach Groups, which then dispersed to their original Lines of Communication roles. In 1993, 50 years after the original formation of 102nd Beach Sub Area, Headquarters Combat Service Support Group (Germany) was established in Gütersloh, Germany.

In July 1999 the formation was re-titled 102nd Logistic Brigade and in October 1999 the Halberd was officially adopted as the formation tactical recognition flash. The Halberd appears in Jeremiah as a symbol of strength, success and restoration. Its interpretation as a restorer of combat power following bloodshed, exhaustion and hunger reflects the operational role of 102nd Logistic Brigade. The dual capability of the Halberd, both as a weapon and a hand tool represents the combination of artisan and technical skills, which complement the military training of Brigade personnel.

References

External links 
102nd Logistic Brigade

Brigades of the British Army
102
Military units and formations established in 1993